Chandur may refer to:

 Chandur, Telangana, a town in the Nalgonda district in the state of Telangana, India
 Chandur Biswa, a village in the Buldhana district in the state of Maharashtra, India
 Chandur, Maharashtra, a city in the Amravati district in the state of Maharashtra, India
 Chandurbazar, a town in the Amravati district in the state of Maharashtra, India